3logy is the Pinoy trio boyband, courtesy from GMA Records.

Final Members
Jeric Gonzales
Jak Roberto
Abel Estanislao

Early career
GMA Artist Center is launching a new boyband: 3logy, composed of Jeric Gonzales, Jak Roberto, and Abel Estanislao. Jeric Gonzales and Abel Estanislao were co-stars in Teen Gen and they are best friends and brothers. They just recorded their first single, Maybe It’s You, a remake of Jolina Magdangal's song. It was used in the rewind of Ako si Kim Samsoon and GMA Music. It was later released on iTunes for digital downloading. The three boys were chosen by GMA artist execs and handlers from their roster of young male stars.

Later career
“Pinagbotohan daw po lahat ng young actors at kaming tatlo ang nakuha,” says Jeric, the eldest at 22. “We all sing but we underwent training with our coach, Zebedee Zuniga, who taught us how to enhance our harmony and blending.”

Jeric was the male winner in Protégé and has done both TV soaps (Pyra and Strawberry Lane) and movies (Hustisya and Dementia). He was a nursing graduate when he joined Protege.

He used to be paired with Thea Tolentino, the Protege female winner. But Thea is now in the long-running “The Half Sisters”. “Swerte nga niya, tuloy-tuloy ang show nila, halos one year na. Magkapareha pa rin naman kami as the endorsers of Boardwalk for their casual denim and T-shirts.”

Jak is John Rommel Roberto in real life, 21 years old, an HRM graduate and a regular in Walang Tulugan. He has done movies like Asintado and the anti-bullying advocacy film, Potpot, which was shown in various schools and universities. His last soap was With a Smile with Andrea Torres.

Abel Estanislao was taking up sports education in UP when he joined “Teen Gen” but is now enrolled online taking up business management. His moreno good looks remind people of the young Richard Gomez. After Teen Gen, he was cast in other soaps like Maghihintay Pa Rin, Villa Quintana and The Half Sisters. “Usually, best friend ako noong bida, like Andre Paras in ‘Half Sisters’,” he says. “Now, kasama rin ako sa bagong soap na ‘Healing Hearts’ with Kristoffer Martin.”

His dad is related to the Ilagans of showbiz and cousin of the late Jay Ilagan and Janno Gibbs, while his mom is a cousin of Dexter Doria. His showbiz crush is Kylie Padilla and he hopes to work with her someday.

End of 3logy & Post 3logy
3logy disbanded in 2016 after Abel quit his showbiz career.

Former 3logy member Jak Roberto is now a talented both movie and TV actor and also a TV host, Jak also formerly co hosted "Walang Tulugan With The Master Showman" from 2011 to 2016 on GMA Channel 7 with the late master showman, comedian, and TV host German "Kuya Germs" Moreno.  Jak is currently seen in a various teleseryes of both GMA 7 & GTV 27 (formerly GMA News TV 27).

Discography

Studio Album

See also
La Diva

Filipino boy bands
Filipino pop music groups
Musical groups established in 2015
GMA Network personalities
GMA Music artists
Musical groups disestablished in 2016
2015 establishments in the Philippines